Image Works was a British video game publisher that served as a publishing label for Mirrorsoft between 1988 and 1992, when the parent company went bankrupt.

History 
The first two games published under the Image Works label were Fernandez Must Die and Foxx Fights Back. Image Works notably became the European publisher for all the titles developed by The Bitmap Brothers, starting with their second game Speedball, until The Bitmap Brothers founded their own publishing brand Renegade Software. Over the course of its existence, Image Works also acquired the publishing rights to film adaptations from the Back to the Future and Predator franchises, as well as home computer ports of arcade and console games such as Passing Shot, Cisco Heat and the first two Teenage Mutant Ninja Turtles games by Konami: these ports and adaptations were consistently released on all the Western 8-bit and 16-bit computer systems supported by the publisher. Until the demise of Mirrorsoft in 1992, games were published on ZX Spectrum, Amstrad CPC, C64, Amiga, Atari ST and MS-DOS as well as other platforms such as the MSX and Sega Master System.

Games published

References 

Video game companies established in 1988
Video game companies disestablished in 1992
Defunct video game companies of the United Kingdom